Clarence Fagan True, AIA (1860–1928) was an American architect in New York City, one of the most prolific and competent architects to work on the Upper West Side and in Harlem during the last decade of the 19th century and the early part of the 20th century.

Early life
Born 1860, True was the son of an Episcopal clergyman from College Point, Queens. The family moved to Manhattan, and by 1890, True was working in the same office building as developer Charles G. Judson.

Career
True "worked in the office of the Gothicist Richard M. Upjohn until he went out on his own in 1884 with a few minor commissions, like two in Queens: a Queen Anne cottage in Flushing and a Gothic-style clubhouse for the Aerial Athletic Association in Woodside." About 1890 Judson hired True, at that point a newly established architect. The same year, True planned his first row houses on the West Side of New York City. In 1891 he designed buildings at 157 and 159 West 88th Street, the low stoop row houses were each constructed for US$12,000 a piece. His development corporation for his speculative buildings was the Riverside Building Company.

Two richly varied rows of True's signature "low-stoop" townhouses, contrasting harmoniously in Italian, French Gothic and Flemish Renaissance taste, remain to recall his presence in the Upper West Side; they are at 316-26 West 85th Street (1892) and at 103, 104, 105, and 107-109 Riverside Drive awith 332 West 83 Street (1898–99).

An additional row remains at 469-77 West 143rd Street (1893), which includes four townhouses and one five-story multifamily apartment building with commercial frontage at 1681-87 Amsterdam Avenue in Hamilton Heights, Manhattan. Several other examples survive in Harlem's Sugar Hill neighborhood including 43-57 St. Nicholas Place and 842 and 844 St. Nicholas Avenue.

William Van Alen, architect of the Chrysler Building, trained in his office.

Works
 1892: John B. Leech Residence, 520 West End Avenue.
Row of five townhouses on West 143rd Street, Hamilton Heights, Manhattan.

References

1928 deaths
1860 births
American residential architects
Defunct architecture firms based in New York City
People from Queens, New York
Architects from New York City